Thomas Glenn Darling (born April 30, 1932) is a retired major general in the United States Air Force who served as deputy commander in chief and chief of staff United States Atlantic Command from 1986 to 1987. He graduated from Texas A&M University in 1954 and served as Commandant of the Texas A&M University Corps of Cadets following retirement from 1987 to 1996.

References

1932 births
Living people
United States Army generals